Stake Pool (also written as Stakepool) is a small rural hamlet in the county of Lancashire, England. It is on the Over Wyre  region of the Fylde coast, west of Garstang near Pilling.

References

External links

Villages in Lancashire
Pilling
The Fylde